Ten Songs by Adam Again is a 1988 album by rock band Adam Again, released on Broken Records, their second release.

Track listing
 "Tree House" (composed by G. Eugene and Steve Hindalong)   (6:52)
 "Beat Peculiar" (composed by G. Eugene and Steve Hindalong)   (8:19)
 "Who Can Hold Us" (composed by G. Eugene)   (4:29)   
 "Babylon" (Traditional)   (1:45)
 "I've Seen Dominoes" (composed by G. Eugene)   (6:15)
 "Trouble With Lies" (composed by G. Eugene)   (5:16)
 "Ain't No Sunshine" (composed by Bill Withers)   (2:38)
 "Eyes Wide Open" (composed by G. Eugene)   (5:51)
 "Every Word I Say" (composed by G. Eugene)   (5:46)
 "The Tenth Song" (composed by G. Eugene)   (5:47)

Production notes
 Produced by Gene Eugene

References

1988 albums
Adam Again albums
Broken Records (record label) albums